Garnison Church, Copenhagen

The Garnison Church is a church at Sankt Annæ Plads in Copenhagen, Denmark. The Baroque church  was erected  as a church primarily intended for military personnel stationed in the city.

History

In the 17th century, Copenhagen had become home to a sizeable garrison. A military church was built at Kastellet in 1670, but its modest size only allowed it to serve the personnel at the fortress. The rest of the troops in the city had to use Church of Holmen, a former anchor forge which had been converted into a naval church in 1619.

When Sophie Amalienborg burned down in 1689, its chapel survived the flames and was subsequently put at the disposal of the Army. However, the small building which had been built for members of the royal court only served as a temporary solution. King Christian V therefore provided a tract of land at Dronningens Tværgade for the construction of a new church for the Army and military engineer Georg Philip Müller (ca 1684-ca 1706) completed a set of renderings in 1697. In order to keep down the costs of building the church, materials from Sophie Amalienborg were used. This also applied to the church chapel's furniture.

When King Frederick IV ascended the throne in 1699, he moved the project to a site in the southernmost section of Sophie Amalienborg's former gardens. Construction began in 1703, still to  Müller's design but under the supervision of Domenico Pelli (1657–1728). The following year it was decided to build the church to a larger and somewhat modified design and the project was taken over by Danish architect Wilhelm Friedrich von Platen (1667–1732). The church was inaugurated on 24 March 1706.

The church underwent restoration in 1885 under the direction  of architect Ludvig Knudsen (1843–1924). At that time, a burial chapel was built following drawings by Ludvig Knudsen as a free-standing building in the former cemetery. The interior of the church has been changed, repaired and renewed many times. The interior appearance of the church primarily stems from the renovation of 1954–1961 as it sought to revert to a more original appearance.

Monuments and memorials

Burials
 Johan Peter Emilius Hartmann (1805–1900), painter
 Christian August Lorentzen (1729–1828), painter
 lfert Ricard (1872–1929), writer and priest

References

External links
 Garnisonskirken Web site

Lutheran churches in Copenhagen
18th-century Church of Denmark churches
Churches in the Diocese of Copenhagen
1706 establishments in Denmark